Streptomyces abikoensis is a bacterium species from the genus Streptomyces which produces the antibiotic abikoviromycin. Streptomyces abikoensis has been isolated from Abiko in Japan.

See also 
 List of Streptomyces species

References

Further reading

External links 
Type strain of Streptomyces abikoensis at BacDive -  the Bacterial Diversity Metadatabase

abikoensis
Bacteria described in 1991